Thuraya al-Hafez (1911-2000), (Arabic ثريا الحافظ) was a Syrian politician who campaigned against the niqab and for women's rights.

After schooling in Damascus, Thuraya became in 1928 one of Syria's first female primary school teachers. In 1927, Thuraya established the Damascene Women's Awakening Society to promote a female intelligentsia, and became a prominent women's rights activist in the 1930s. 1930 saw her establishing the Women's School Alumnae Association for educated women. In May 1942, she led a protest march by one hundred women to the government headquarters in Damascus, where they all lifted their veils. She gave a speech arguing that 'the veil we wore was never mentioned in God's Holy Book or by Muhammad'. In 1947, she became an instructor in Arabic literature at Damascus's prestigious Tajheez School.

In 1953, Thuraya became the first woman to nominate herself for a seat in the Syrian parliament. Although she was subsequently defeated, her endeavours were significant steps toward achieving their goal of elevating the status of the women in the Arab world. She claimed that the vote itself was tampered with and that she had in fact secured 75% of the vote.

Thuraya's husband, Munir al-Rayyes, owned the Damascus daily paper Barada, for which Thuraya began writing in 1953. In the same year, she 'launched her own literary and political salon in Damascus, which was open to both genders. The salon was convened in her own house and was named after Sukayna bint al-Hussein, the great-granddaughter of Prophet Muhammad, who presided over the first literary salon in Muslim history'.

Like her husband, Thuraya supported Gamal Abdel Nasser of Egypt both during and after the United Arab Republic.

Sources
Sami M. Moubayed, Steel and Silk: Men and Women who Shaped Syria 1900-2000 (Seattle: Cune Press, 2006), p. 435.

References

1911 births
2000 deaths
Syrian women's rights activists